Wimalaweera Dissanayake is a Sri Lankan politician and current member of parliament for Digamadulla District. He was elected on 18 August 2015 from United People's Freedom Alliance. After the 2019 Presidential election, the newly elected president Gotabhaya Rajapaksa appointed him as state minister of wildlife on 27 November 20000, and he was once again appointed to the same post after the cabinet stepped down in the 2022 crisis. He served from 18 April 2022 until 9 May 2022 following another mass resignation of the Sri Lankan cabinet.

Political career 
He was the opposition leader of the Damana Pradeshiya Sabha (local council), Ampara.

References 

United People's Freedom Alliance politicians
Sri Lanka Podujana Peramuna politicians